Killing the Shadows is a 2006 Turkish comedy film directed by Ezel Akay.

Cast 
 Haluk Bilginer - Karagöz
 Beyazıt Öztürk - Hacivat
 Şebnem Dönmez - Ayse Hatun
 Güven Kıraç - Kadi Pervane
 Levent Kazak - Dimitri
 Ayşen Gruda - Kam Ana
 Ezel Akay - Süleyman II (Eşrefoğlu)
 Muhittin Korkmaz - Alaeddin Eretna
 Ahmet Sarıcan - Demirtaş
 Mete Horozoğlu- Görevli
 Hasan Ali Mete - Küşteri
 Serdar Gökhan - Köse Mihal
 Ragıp Savaş - Orhan Gazi
 Tansu Biçer - Misak

References

External links 

2006 black comedy films
2006 films
2000s historical comedy-drama films
Turkish historical comedy-drama films
Films set in the Ottoman Empire
Turkish black comedy films
2006 comedy films
2000s Turkish-language films